Dyan Cannon (born Samille Diane Friesen; January 4, 1937) is an American actress, filmmaker and editor. Her accolades include a Saturn Award, a Golden Globe Award, three Academy Award nominations, and a star on the Hollywood Walk of Fame. She was named Female Star of the Year by the National Association of Theatre Owners in 1973 and the Hollywood Women's Press Club in 1979.

A former beauty queen who held the title of Miss West Seattle, Cannon made her television debut in 1958. Over the next decade, she became a common sight on episodic shows while appearing sporadically on Broadway and in B-movies. In 1969, she had her breakthrough film role in the sex comedy Bob & Carol & Ted & Alice, for which she was nominated for an Academy Award for Best Supporting Actress. Cannon was nominated in that category again for Heaven Can Wait (1978), which earned her a Golden Globe Award for Best Supporting Actress – Motion Picture, and was nominated for a Golden Globe Award for Best Actress – Motion Picture Drama for her lead role in Such Good Friends (1971). She also was nominated for an Academy Award for Best Live Action Short Film as the producer of Number One (1976), making her the first woman to receive Oscar nominations both in front of and behind the camera.

Other films in which Cannon has performed include The Love Machine (1971), Shamus (1973), The Last of Sheila (1973), Child Under a Leaf (1974), Revenge of the Pink Panther (1978), Honeysuckle Rose (1980), Coast to Coast (1980), Deathtrap (1982), Author! Author! (1982), Caddyshack II (1988), 8 Heads in a Duffel Bag (1997), Out to Sea (1997), and Boynton Beach Club (2005). Cannon made her feature directorial debut with 1990's semi-autobiographical drama The End of Innocence, which she also wrote and starred in. From 1997 to 2000 she played a recurring role on the legal series Ally McBeal.

Before her career took off, Cannon was married to Cary Grant for three years and gave birth to his only child, daughter Jennifer. Reluctant to discuss the marriage since their 1968 divorce, Cannon turned down publishing deals following Grant's death in 1986. Her long-awaited memoir Dear Cary (2011) became a New York Times Best Seller. In 2022, it was announced that the book would be adapted into a miniseries for ITV with Cannon executive producing.

Early life
Cannon was born Samille Diane Friesen in Tacoma, Washington on January 4, 1937, the daughter of housewife Claire (née Portnoy) and life insurance salesman Ben Friesen. She was raised in the Jewish faith of her Ashkenazi Jewish mother, who was an immigrant from Russia; her father was Anabaptist of Russian Mennonite ancestry. Her younger brother is jazz musician David Friesen. Cannon attended West Seattle High School and was crowned Miss West Seattle in 1954. She spent two-and-a-half years at the University of Washington.

In 1957, Cannon dropped out of college and went to live with her Aunt Sally in Phoenix, Arizona, where she took a job at Merrill Lynch & Co. Courted by a traveling businessman, she got engaged and followed her fiancé to Los Angeles. They soon parted, but she decided to stay in the area and enroll at UCLA. A part-time modeling job led to an interview with producer Jerry Wald, who suggested she change her last name to Cannon. She signed to MGM, doing promotional work for the film Les Girls, and studied with acting teacher Sanford Meisner.

Career
Cannon made her film debut in 1960 in The Rise and Fall of Legs Diamond; she had appeared on television since the late 1950s, including a guest appearance on Bat Masterson as Mary Lowery in the 1959 episode "Lady Luck" and again in a 1961 episode as Diane Jansen in "The Price of Paradise". She appeared in 1959 on CBS's Wanted: Dead or Alive, in episode 52, "Vanishing Act", as Nicole McCready. About this time, she was on the CBS western Johnny Ringo, starring Don Durant, and on Jack Lord's western Stoney Burke on ABC. She also appeared on Hawaiian Eye, using her name Diane Cannon, in 1961, opposite Tracey Steele, Robert Conrad, and Connie Stevens. 

In 1962, Cannon appeared on Broadway with Jane Fonda and Bradford Dillman in The Fun Couple. Next came the national touring company of the musical How to Succeed in Business Without Really Trying, in which she played Rosemary.

In 1964 she guest starred on Gunsmoke, playing "Ivy Norton", an abused daughter looking to marry the man she loves in the episode "Aunt Thede" (S10E13). She portrayed Mona Elliott in the episode "The Man Behind the Man" of the 1964 CBS drama series The Reporter. She also made guest appearances on 77 Sunset Strip, The Untouchables, the 1960 episode "Sheriff of the Town" of the first-run syndicated western series Two Faces West with Walter Coy as Cauter and the 1962 Ripcord episode "The Helicopter Race" as Ripcord Inc.'s secretary and receptionist Marion Hines. She had another role in the movie The Murder Game (1965), then took four years off. 

Cannon's first major film role came in 1969's Bob & Carol & Ted & Alice, which earned her Academy Award and Golden Globe nominations. In 1971 she starred in four films: The Love Machine, from the novel by Jacqueline Susann; The Anderson Tapes with Sean Connery and Christopher Walken; The Burglars with Jean-Paul Belmondo and Omar Sharif; and Otto Preminger's Such Good Friends, for which she received a Golden Globe nomination for Best Actress. Her name was used to market a fifth release that year, Doctors' Wives, in which she had top billing despite only making a cameo appearance.

In 1973, Cannon starred opposite Burt Reynolds in Shamus and played an agent based on Sue Mengers in The Last of Sheila, and was named Female Star of the Year by the National Association of Theatre Owners. In 1974, she gave a critically acclaimed performance in Child Under a Leaf and starred in the made-for-TV movie Virginia Hill with Harvey Keitel. Following this she took a four-year absence from acting in feature films.

Cannon starred in her own musical stage act at Caesar's Palace in Las Vegas and Harrah's Lake Tahoe during the mid-1970s. She then enrolled in the Women's Directing Workshop of the American Film Institute. She became the first Oscar-nominated actress to be nominated in the Best Short Film, Live Action Category for Number One (1976), a project which Cannon produced, directed, wrote and edited. It was a story about adolescent sexual curiosity. In 1978, Cannon co-starred in Revenge of the Pink Panther. That same year, she appeared in Heaven Can Wait, for which she received another Oscar nomination and won a Golden Globe Award for Best Supporting Actress.

In 1976, she hosted Saturday Night Live during its first season and she guest starred in the fourth season of The Muppet Show in 1979. She co-starred with then-boyfriend Armand Assante in the TV movie Lady of the House (1978), a dramatization of the life of Sally Stanford.

In the early 1980s, Cannon, who is also a singer/songwriter, appeared in Honeysuckle Rose (1980) with Willie Nelson, Coast to Coast (1980) with Robert Blake, Author! Author! (1982) with Al Pacino, and Sidney Lumet's Deathtrap (1982) with Michael Caine and Christopher Reeve. She starred in the TV movie Having It All (1982) as well as a miniseries, Master of the Game (1984), then had the title role in Jenny's War (1985). After making Rock 'n' Roll Mom (1988) for Disney, she appeared with an ensemble cast in Caddyshack II (1988). In addition, she co-wrote the title track for Chaka Khan's album, The Woman I Am, with Brenda Russell.

For her contributions to the film industry, Cannon was inducted into the Hollywood Walk of Fame in 1983 with a motion pictures star located at 6608 Hollywood Boulevard.

Cannon wrote, directed, and starred in the semi-autobiographical film The End of Innocence (1990). She subsequently appeared opposite Phylicia Rashad in Jailbirds (1991) and Kris Kristofferson and Tony Curtis in Christmas in Connecticut (1992), the latter of which was directed by Arnold Schwarzenegger, before reuniting with Bob & Carol & Ted & Alice director Paul Mazursky for The Pickle (1993), alongside Danny Aiello.

Cannon had guest roles on the popular television shows Diagnosis: Murder and The Practice, as well as being a semi-regular on Ally McBeal. In 1997 she could be seen in three major studio film releases: 8 Heads in a Duffel Bag with Joe Pesci; a remake of That Darn Cat; and Out to Sea with Walter Matthau and Jack Lemmon. Also that year, she worked with Sarah Michelle Gellar in the TV movie Beverly Hills Family Robinson. In 2001 and 2002, she had a regular part in the TV series Three Sisters.

In 2005, she appeared in Boynton Beach Club, a movie about aging Floridians who have just lost their spouses; Cannon's real-life ex Michael Nouri played her love interest. Her later roles included A Kiss at Midnight (2008) for Hallmark and the unaired pilot Women Without Men (2010) with Lorraine Bracco and Penny Marshall. She wrote and directed another short, Unleashed (2010). After a hiatus from the screen, she acted in the equestrian themed family film Hope's Legacy (2021).

Cannon published a best-selling memoir, Dear Cary: My Life with Cary Grant, in October 2011. She had previously been approached by Swifty Lazar to write about her late ex-husband in 1986, turning down "millions," and declined another publishing offer some years later from Jacqueline Kennedy Onassis, stating that there was still healing that needed to happen. Cannon serves as executive producer of a four-part miniseries based on her book, entitled Archie, which began production in August 2022 and will air on ITV.

Personal life
In 1961, Cannon began dating actor Cary Grant, who was 33 years her senior. They married on July 22, 1965 and had one daughter, Jennifer (born February 26, 1966). Cannon filed for divorce in September 1967, and it was finalized on March 21, 1968.

Cannon married real estate investor Stanley Fimberg on April 18, 1985. They divorced in 1991.

From 1978 to 1979, Cannon and Armand Assante were a steady item in public. She has also been in relationships with comedian Mort Sahl, producer Murray Shostak, talent agent Ron Weisner and sculptor Carl Hartman, as well as directors Hal Ashby and Jerry Schatzberg, and actors Hy Chase, Ron Ely and Michael Nouri. She is still friends with Nouri and accompanied him to a premiere nearly 40 years after their breakup.

In 1972, Cannon revealed that she engaged in primal therapy. She is a fan of the Los Angeles Lakers and has attended Lakers games for over three decades. She is a born-again Christian.

Filmography

References

External links
 
 
 

1937 births
Living people
20th-century American actresses
21st-century American actresses
Actresses from Los Angeles
Actresses from Tacoma, Washington
American film actresses
American people of Russian-Jewish descent
American television actresses
American women film directors
Best Supporting Actress Golden Globe (film) winners
Converts to Evangelicalism from Judaism
Film directors from Washington (state)
Jewish American actresses
Sports spectators
West Seattle High School alumni
21st-century American Jews
American Ashkenazi Jews
American Mennonites